Darvazeh Shemiran Metro Station is the junction of Tehran Metro Line 2 and Tehran Metro Line 4. It is located in junction of Baharestan Street and Mazandaran Street and Namjou Street nad Sepah Street. It is between Imam Hossein Metro Station and Baharestan Metro Station in Line 2 and Meydan-e Shohada Metro Station and Darvazeh Dowlat Metro Station in Line 4.

References

Tehran Metro stations